Sex Workers Outreach Project-USA (SWOP-USA) is a national social justice network dedicated to the fundamental human rights of sex workers and their communities, focusing on ending violence and stigma through education and advocacy. SWOP might be considered a constructive program by nonviolent scholars and activists, as it attempts to create more imaginative and just communities, especially considering its focus on equality and education through advocacy. The organization was founded by Robyn Few on August 13, 2003, and their first major action was to organize the first annual International Day to End Violence Against Sex Workers (December 17) with the Green River Memorial for the victims of Gary Ridgway, the "Green River Killer".

History
The original Sex Workers Outreach Project (SWOP) was founded in Australia and the United States (US) SWOP has developed into the largest sex worker rights organization in the country, with chapters active in Tucson, Arizona; Michigan; Chicago, Illinois; Las Vegas, Nevada; Los Angeles/UCLA, California; Sacramento, California; San Francisco, California; Denver, Colorado; New York City, New York; Seattle, Washington; New Orleans, Louisiana; and Pittsburgh, Pennsylvania.

Activities
In 2004, SWOP spearheaded a voter ballot initiative to decriminalize prostitution in Berkeley, California. Other work focused on amending so-called "protective" legislation, like the Trafficking Victims Protection Act (TVPA) of 2000 (and its reauthorization in 2005 with the new "End Demand" provisions), with the goal being to increase its efficacy in protecting trafficking victims, while decreasing the number of arrests of independent sex workers who have never been victims of human trafficking.

In April 2014, SWOP-Chicago activists attended a rally at the JW Marriott hotel in Chicago, where Amnesty International USA held its Human Rights Conference. The activists addressed a protest by a group that included Attorney General Lisa Madigan, former sex workers and others opposed to Amnesty International USA's discussion on the decriminalization of sex work. Donald Bierer, chairman of Amnesty USA's Priority Subcommittee, stated to the media: "We think it's great that people are having that conversation publicly in Chicago. This is what democracy looks like. What we're hearing from both of these groups will inform whatever Amnesty ultimately does and says about the human rights of those who are engaged in sex work."

SWOP-Chicago has provided a variety of resources over the years including a monthly sex worker support group, free legal services, a warm line, trainings for providers and social service agencies working, social and community engagement events, street outreach, and sex worker art shows.

SWOP Sacramento was established by Kristen DiAngelo and Stacey Swimme on June 27, 2014, and is dedicated to reducing harm, improving healthcare, and upholding both the civil and human rights of sex workers and their communities. Its focus is on ending violence and stigma through education and advocacy. It addresses the health and well-being of both trafficking victims and those engaged in survival sex.
In conjunction with Safer Alternatives through Networking and Education (SANE), SWOP Sacramento conducted a needs assessment of sex workers in Sacramento. It found significant problems with homelessness, trafficking and survival sex by an underserved population. SWOP Sacramento has developed a program called Better Lives through Bundles that raises money to provide basic needs items for sex workers working on the street.

SWOP Pittsburgh (or SWOP PGH) is the local chapter of Pittsburgh, Pennsylvania, started in 2018 by Jessie Sage, Moriah Ella Mason, and PJ Sage amid "an increasingly conservative political climate." Mason is a former stripper and currently an artist, massage therapist, and educator. Jessie Sage, formerly a PhD student, grew frustrated with academia and left to become a doula. PJ Sage, Jessie's husband, is currently a professor studying web camming and sex camming. The chapter's aim is to connect sex workers to local social services, and the chapter works with health institutions in Pittsburgh. In 2020, SWOP PGH created Pittsburgh's only mutual aid fund to support sex workers who were impacted by the pandemic. The mutual aid fund continues today. Partners associated with SWOP PGH are Western Pennsylvania Diaper Bank, Planned Parenthood of Western Pennsylvania, and Allies for Health + Wellbeing.

SWOP PGH's mutual aid fund offers grants between $50 and $200, depending on the amount of money available in the chapter at the time. If the chapter is unable to meet the demand of a sex worker, they offer a social media boost of that person's payment app or crowdfunding campaign. Funding occurs in 3-month cycles, and individuals are eligible to receive funding once per cycle. A link to the application for the Sex Worker Mutual Aid Fund is here. SWOP PGH also offers the Steel City Sex Worker Resource Guide, which includes local COVID-19 information, resources for various Pittsburgh necessities: food, housing, healthcare (reproductive, LGBTQIA+ services, HIV/AIDS services, crisis and suicide prevention, mental healthcare providers), accountants, legal aid and jail support, community groups, and massage therapists/bodyworkers.

SWOP PGH has been involved in various advocacy events and in the local Pittsburgh press since its creation. In 2019, the chapter led the charge against University of Pittsburgh's first annual Hacking4Humanity hackathon event, arguing that the event's aim of finding solutions to human trafficking–including awareness raising, perpetrator persecution, and survivor support–would not help trafficking victims. SWOP PGH and hundreds of people from eight other organizations signed a petition, a very low-stakes nonviolent tactic. More recently, SWOP PGH has engaged in community advocacy work, including a clothing swap and day to tell stories to celebrate the most important day for SWOP as a whole, International Day to End Violence Against Sex Workers (December 17th). The chapter has hosted various, support groups, Q&A sessions, and teach-ins in 2022, including one about being a better strip club client and one to educate about legal issues, hosted by a well-known queer Pittsburgh legal aide attorney. Also in 2022, SWOP PGH hosted a child-friendly DIY Valentine card-making workshop, where all community members were invited to create and send Valentine's Day cards to sex workers (including those incarcerated), immigrants, and friends and lovers.

Aside from these community-building events, SWOP PGH has also been involved with various legal and political issues in Pittsburgh. In Allegheny County, Pennsylvania, dozens of prostitution arrests and cases in 2017 involved the weaponization of women's cell phones. Chapter organizer Gabrielle Monroe claimed that phones are vital to the safety of sex workers, and they should not be charged with "possessing instruments of crime" in these scenarios. Similarly, condoms were also being weaponized against sex workers as "instruments of crime," and SWOP PGH along with various partners in the city successfully advocated for the removal of this legal implication. SWOP PGH originally wrote a letter to the Allegheny County District Attorney, Stephen Zappala, Jr., pleading for something to be done.

See also
Decriminalizing sex work
Prostitution and the law
Sex workers' rights

References

External links
Main SWOP-USA website
SWOP-Chicago website
SWOP-New York website
SWOP-Sacramento website
SWOP Behind Bars
SWOP Pittsburgh

Civil liberties advocacy groups in the United States
Human rights organizations based in the United States
Organizations established in 2003
Political advocacy groups in the United States
Prostitution in the United States
Sex industry in the United States
Sex worker organizations in the United States
Social justice organizations